Roberts's triangle theorem, a result in discrete geometry, states that every simple arrangement of  lines has at least  triangular faces. Thus, three lines form a triangle, four lines form at least two triangles, five lines form at least three triangles, etc. It is named after Samuel Roberts, a British mathematician who published it in 1889.

Statement and example
The theorem states that every simple arrangement of  lines in the Euclidean plane has at least  triangular faces. Here, an arrangement is simple when it has no two parallel lines and no three lines through the same point.

One way to form an arrangement of  lines with exactly  triangular faces is to choose the lines to be tangent to a semicircle. For lines arranged in this way, the only triangles are the ones formed by three lines with consecutive points of tangency. As the  lines have   consecutive triples, they also have  triangles.

Proof
Branko Grünbaum found the proof in Roberts's original paper "unconvincing", and credits the first correct proof of Roberts's theorem to Robert W. Shannon, in 1979. He presents instead the following more elementary argument, first published in Russian by Alexei Belov. It depends implicitly on a simpler version of the same theorem, according to which every simple arrangement of three or more lines has at least one triangular face. This follows easily by induction from the fact that adding a line to an arrangement cannot decrease the number of triangular faces: if the line cuts an existing triangle, one of the resulting two pieces is again a triangle. On the other hand, although the bound of Roberts's theorem increases with each added line, the number of triangles in any particular arrangement may sometimes remain unchanged.

If the  given lines are all moved without changing their slopes, their new positions can be described by a system of  real numbers, the offsets of each line from its original position. For each triangular face, there is a linear equation on the offsets of its three lines that, if satisfied, causes the face to retain its original area. If there could be fewer than  triangles, then (because there would be more variables than equations constraining them) it would be possible to fix two of the lines in place and find a simultaneous linear motion of all remaining lines, keeping their slopes fixed, that preserves all of the triangle areas. Such a motion must pass through arrangements that are not simple, for instance when one of the moving lines passes over the crossing point of the two fixed lines. At the time when the moving lines first form a non-simple arrangement, three or more lines meet at a point. Just before these lines meet, this subset of lines would have a triangular face (also present in the original arrangement) whose area approaches zero. But this contradicts the invariance of the face areas. The contradiction shows that the assumption that there are fewer than  triangles cannot be true.

Related results

Whereas Roberts's theorem concerns the fewest possible triangles made by a given number of lines, the related Kobon triangle problem concerns the largest number possible.

Roberts's theorem can be generalized from simple line arrangements to some non-simple arrangements, to arrangements in the projective plane rather than in the Euclidean plane, and to arrangements of hyperplanes in higher-dimensional spaces. Beyond line arrangements, the same bound as Roberts's theorem holds for arrangements of pseudolines.

References

Discrete geometry
Triangles